Michael J. Ware (born 1939, Bromley)  is a chemist and photographer, known for his work in alternative photographic processes, earlier methods of printing photographic images that were succeeded by the more common silver-gelatin used today. In the Present, Ware acts as a consultant, most recently on the history and development of the platinotype and palladium processes. His has also written about chemistry's influence on the history of photography.

Early life and education
Ware was born in 1939 in Bromley. He earned his Ph.D. at the University of Oxford in 1965. His thesis was The vibrational spectra of some inorganic complexes.

Awards and honours
 1982 Fellow of the Royal Society of Chemistry
 1990 Hood Medal, awarded by the Royal Photographic Society

Selected publications

Academic works

Published books

External links
 Mike Ware Alternative Photography

References

1939 births
Living people
Photographers from London
People from Bromley
Fellows of the Royal Society of Chemistry
Alumni of the University of Oxford